John William Lee (13 January 1881 – 22 August 1960) was a British athlete.  He competed in the 1908 Summer Olympics in London. He was affiliated with Heaton Harriers, a Newcastle upon Tyne-based club.

In the 800 metres, Lee finished second in his semifinal heat and did not advance to the final.  His time was 2:01.7, only .3 seconds behind John Halstead's winning time. Lee's time in the 1500 metres semifinals was 4:12.4, putting him in fourth place in the heat and eliminating him from the final.

Lee went on to serve as chairman of chairman of Newcastle United F.C. from 1949 to 1953.

References

Sources
 
 
 

Athletes (track and field) at the 1908 Summer Olympics
Olympic athletes of Great Britain
English male middle-distance runners
1881 births
1960 deaths